The Mitsubishi Foundation (財団法人三菱財団; Zaidan Hōjin Mitsubishi Zaidan) is a Japanese organization providing grants for academic research.

History
In 1970, the Mitsubishi Group established the Mitsubishi Foundation to commemorate the centennial anniversary of the founding of the first Mitsubishi company. That foundation donates large sums of money annually to support scientific research and public-interest activities.

External links
Foundation website (in Japanese)
Foundation website (in English)

References 

Foundation
Mitsubishi Foundation
Scientific research foundations
Organizations established in 1970
1970 establishments in Japan